Haydn Davies  may refer to:

Haydn Davies (politician) (1905–1976), British MP for St Pancras South West
Haydn Davies (cricketer) (1912–1993), Welsh cricketer
Haydn Llewellyn Davies (1921–2008), Canadian sculptor